Johnny Harold "Sky" High (April 25, 1957 – June 13, 1987) was an American professional basketball player for the Phoenix Suns of the NBA. He spent four seasons with Phoenix and missed only one game in his first three years.

Born in Birmingham, Alabama, High attended high school at Birmingham's Jones Valley High School.  He went on to play college basketball at Lawson State Community College and University of Nevada and was selected by Phoenix in the second round of the 1979 NBA draft.  As of February 2018, he is the last Nevada Wolf Pack player to achieve a triple double in a game.  During an NBA game against Washington on January 28, 1981, High recorded nine steals.

High died in an early-morning automobile accident on June 13, 1987 in Phoenix, Arizona.

See also
List of National Basketball Association players with most steals in a game

Notes

External links
www.basketball-reference.com
Player Profile @ thedraftreview.com

1957 births
1987 deaths
African-American basketball players
American men's basketball players
Baltimore Lightning players
Basketball players from Birmingham, Alabama
Cincinnati Slammers players
Junior college men's basketball players in the United States
Nevada Wolf Pack men's basketball players
Phoenix Suns draft picks
Phoenix Suns players
Road incident deaths in Arizona
Shooting guards
Wyoming Wildcatters players
20th-century African-American sportspeople